The Pangaion Hills (Homeric Greek: Nysa; also called Pangaeon, Pangaeum) are a mountain range in Greece, approximately 40 km from Kavala. The highest elevation is 1,956 m at the peak of Koutra.  The Aegean Sea lies to the south and the plains of Philippi-Kavala to the north. The mountain range covers the southeastern portion of the Serres regional unit as well as the northwestern part of the Kavala regional unit which includes the bigger part of the hills.

The Ottoman Turks called the hills Pınar Dağ ("Spring Mount"). The Slavic name is Kushnitsa (Кушница) or Kushinitsa (Кушиница).

Description

The hills are direct across a fertile plain from the ancient city of Philippi, they are located in the ancient country of Sintice, between the Strymon and the Xiropotamos rivers and are covered in the oriental plane and chestnut trees.  Towns found in the Pangaion hills include Nikisiani and Palaiochori which are agricultural in nature and grow mainly grain and tobacco. The town of Palaiochori boasts the ruins of an ancient castle on a peak overlooking the town. Gold and silver were mined in the ancient times. The Athenian tyrant Pisistratus was exiled in the middle of the mountain. It was the rich gold and silver available in the region that made the Athenians send out a colony in 465 to an area known as the Nine Roads (Ennéa Hodoí). The colonists were massacred by nearby Thracians and the colony was abandoned, though the Athenians would return to the area with their colony at Amphipolis.

Pangaion is very often referred to by ancient Greek and Latin sources. It was famous for silver and gold mines, as well as for shipyard wood and the oracle of Dionysus.

The municipality of Pangaio is named after this mountain range and the seat of the municipality is Eleftheroupoli.

See also
Zaeelii:Tribe attested from coins that are from the Pangaion hills.

References

External links
  Greek Mountain Flora
 Pangaio Mountain terrain map by Geopsis

Landforms of Kavala (regional unit)
Landforms of Serres (regional unit)
Mountain ranges of Greece
Geography of Macedonia (region)
Lower Macedonia
Landforms of Eastern Macedonia and Thrace
Quarries in Greece
Rhodope mountain range